John Autry may refer to:
 John Autry (Canadian football) (born 1938), American CFL footballer
 John Autry (politician) (born 1953), American politician